King Cetshwayo District Municipality (formerly Uthungulu District Municipality) is one of the 11 district municipalities ("districts") of KwaZulu-Natal province in South Africa. The seat of the district is Richards Bay. The majority of its 885 944 people speak Zulu (2001 Census). The district code is DC28. It is named after Cetshwayo kaMpande, King of the Zulu Kingdom from 1872 to 1879, who led his nation to victory against the British in the Battle of Isandlwana.

Geography

Neighbours
King Cetshwayo District is surrounded by:
 iLembe to the south (DC29)
 Umkhanyakude to the northeast (DC27)
 The Indian Ocean to the east
 Umzinyathi to the west (DC24)
 Zululand to the north (DC26)

Local municipalities
The district contains the following local municipalities:

Demographics
The following statistics are from the South African National Census of 2011.

Gender

Ethnic group

Age

Sister City

King Cetshwayo District is officially a sister city of Milwaukee, Wisconsin, USA ( Milwaukee, United States). The joining of the two cities was largely enacted from legislation in Wisconsin in collaboration with the Africa Urban Poverty Alleviation Program. In 2009, Sister Cities International launched the Africa Urban Poverty Alleviation Program, a three-year project to alleviate poverty in 25 African cities (including King Cetshwayo District) through water, sanitation and health initiatives. Milwaukee will collaborate with their African counterparts to identify and address the most critical problems in these sectors, which form barriers to sustained development in urban areas. This project is funded by a $7.5 million grant from the Bill & Melinda Gates Foundation. The program is cited to end in middle of the year 2012.

Politics

Election results
Election results for uThungulu (King Cetshwayo District) in the South African general election, 2004.
 Population 18 and over: 477 576 [53.91% of total population]
 Total votes: 252 139 [28.46% of total population]
 Voting % estimate: 52.80% votes as a % of population 18 and over

See also
 Municipal Demarcation Board

References

External links 
 

District Municipalities of KwaZulu-Natal
King Cetshwayo District Municipality